Motorway is a 2012 Hong Kong action film directed by Cheang Pou-soi and starring Shawn Yue, Anthony Wong and Guo Xiaodong.

Cast
 Shawn Yue as Cheung
 Anthony Wong as Lo
 Guo Xiaodong as Sun
 Gordon Lam as Chong
 Barbie Shu as Yee
 Josie Ho as Wei
 Michelle Ye as Mrs. Lo

Critical reception
Variety's Maggie Lee wrote, "Cruising pleasantly until a gripping midfilm turning point, the pic only goes full-throttle in the final payoff, with car chases designed to impress the discerning. To's fans and Asian markets will drive sales traffic."

Accolades

References

External links

Motorway at Rotten Tomatoes

2012 films
Hong Kong action thriller films
Hong Kong auto racing films
Films about automobiles
Films about police officers
2010s Cantonese-language films
2012 action thriller films
Media Asia films
Milkyway Image films
Films set in Hong Kong
Films shot in Hong Kong
2010s Hong Kong films